Nicholas John Harris (born July 23, 1978) is a former American football punter. He played college football at the University of California, Berkeley, where he set the NCAA record for career punting yardage and earned All-American honors.  The Denver Broncos chose him in the fourth round of the 2001 NFL Draft, and he has played professionally for the Cincinnati Bengals, Detroit Lions, Jacksonville Jaguars, and Carolina Panthers of the NFL.

Early life and education
Harris was born in Avondale, Arizona.  He attended Westview High School in Avondale, where he played for the Westview Knights high school football team.  He earned National Coaches' Association All-America honors as a senior with 42.3-yard punting average. He Also earned prep all-state honors as a linebacker and saw action on offense as a receiver and a rusher. He was also an All-state prep soccer player as well.

Harris attended the University of California, where he played for the California Golden Bears football team from 1997 to 2000. He averaged 42.3 yards per punt, and his 13,621 total yards was an NCAA record. His 322 career punts is also an NCAA record.  As a junior in 1999, he had a 44.7 yard average. As a senior in 2000, he was recognized as consensus first-team All-American.

Harris graduated with a bachelor's degree in American studies and later with a master's degree in education.

Professional career

Denver Broncos
Harris was drafted in the fourth round by the Denver Broncos, where he was later waived.

Cincinnati Bengals
In 2001, the Bengals signed him off of waivers. He was released during the 2003 season.

Detroit Lions
The Lions signed Harris October 14, 2003 as a replacement for the injured John Jett and he established himself as the Lions punter for the remainder of the season. In 2005, he was named the Special Teams MVP by The Detroit Lions Quarterback Club, the official booster club of the Lions. On September 3, 2011, Harris was released by the Detroit Lions in favor for Ryan Donahue.

Jacksonville Jaguars
On October 11, 2011, he signed with the Jacksonville Jaguars. On April 28, 2012, the Jacksonville Jaguars released Harris.

Carolina Panthers
Harris signed with the Carolina Panthers on May 7, 2012.  He was released on August 27, 2012.

Second stint with the Detroit Lions
Harris was signed by the Detroit Lions, for a second time, on September 25, 2012.  The signing came after Ben Graham was placed on the season-ending injured reserve list.

Life after football
Following his football career, Nick Harris earned a Masters of Divinity degree in Christian Theology.  In 2015, he began a teaching career at Berean Christian High School in Walnut Creek, California, serving as a Church History and Hermeneutics teacher. In 2019, Harris was hired as the school's principal.

References

1978 births
Living people
People from Avondale, Arizona
Sportspeople from the Phoenix metropolitan area
Players of American football from Arizona
American football punters
California Golden Bears football players
All-American college football players
Denver Broncos players
Cincinnati Bengals players
Detroit Lions players
Jacksonville Jaguars players
Carolina Panthers players